Dorner (or Dörner) is a surname.  Notable people with the surname include:

 August Dorner (1846–1920), German theologian; son of Isaak August Dorner
 Axel Dörner (born 1964), German trumpeter, pianist, and composer
 Carl H. Dorner (1837–1911), German-born American politician
 Christopher Dorner (1979–2013), American police officer and spree killer
 Dalia Dorner (born 1934), Israeli supreme court judge
 Dietrich Dörner (born 1938), German psychologist and emeritus professor
 Françoise Dorner (born 1949), French actress, screenwriter, novelist, and playwright
 Friedrich Karl Dörner (1911–1992), German archaeologist and epigrapher
 Gus Dorner (1876–1956), American basketball player
 Hans-Jürgen Dörner (1951–2022), German football coach and former player
 Helmut Dörner (1909–1945), German NaziWaffen-SS commander
 Herbert Dörner (1930–1991), German international footballer
 Hermann Dorner (1882–1963), German aviation pioneer
 Iben Dorner (born 1978), Danish actress and voice artist
 Irene Dorner (born ?), American banking executive and lawyer
 Isaak August Dorner (1809–1884), German Lutheran church leader; father of August Dorner
 Johann Conrad Dorner (1810–1866), Austrian painter
 Johann Jakob Dorner (disambiguation), several people
 Karl-Heinz Dorner (born 1979), Austrian ski jumper
 Katja Dörner (born 1976), German politician
 Mario Dorner (born 1970), Austrian footballer
 Mirko Dorner (1921–2004), German-Hungarian cellist, composer, and painter
 Steve Dorner (born ?), American software engineer

See also
 Doerner